James Blendick (born 1941) is a Canadian character actor. He is perhaps best known for his 30-year-long association with the Stratford Festival.

Career
Among the productions in which he has performed leads are Much Ado About Nothing, The Cherry Orchard, Waiting For Godot, Juno and the Paycock, Coriolanus, Richard III, Amadeus, The Little Foxes, Cat on a Hot Tin Roof, Midsummer Night's Dream, Twelfth Night and School For Scandal among many others. More recently he appeared in the title role of Titus Andronicus (2000) and as Gonzalo in The Tempest, with Christopher Plummer (2010) at the Stratford Festival.

Blendick has also performed on Broadway (opposite Plummer in Cyrano), at the Guthrie Theater, Minneapolis, at the Old Globe, San Diego and at the Grand Theatre, London. He has also acted extensively in film and television.

Filmography

Film

Television

References

External links

TV.com Biography

American male stage actors
1941 births
Living people
20th-century American male actors
American male film actors
American male television actors
American expatriates in Canada
American emigrants to Canada
Canadian male film actors
Canadian male television actors
Canadian male voice actors